Azo or AZO may refer to:
 Azo compound, a functional group and class of compounds
 Azo dye, a class of colored compounds containing the azo group
 A urinary tract analgesic also known as phenazopyridine
 Azo of Bologna, a medieval Italian jurist
 Azo of Iberia, a Georgian ruler
 An identification code for Kalamazoo/Battle Creek International Airport, an airport in Michigan
 Aluminium-doped zinc oxide, a transparent conducting film
 Alpha Zeta Omega, a pharmaceutical fraternity
 The NYSE ticker symbol for AutoZone
 Awing language, with the ISO 639 3 code "azo"

See also
 Asio (disambiguation)
 ACO (disambiguation)